Eliel Williams Lazo Linares (known as Eliel Lazo or Gods Hands) (born 1 November 1983 in Havana) is a Cuban percussionist,  songwriter, composer, producer, jazz, rock, Latin and pop musician living in Denmark. Eliel is one of the most unique percussionist of these times. In 2011, he received the Danish Music Awards  (DMA World) for his album "El Conguero" (Stunt Records). He won also the "International Percussion Percuba Prize". During his career, he collaborated with musicians such as Oscar Valdes, Chucho Valdes, Herbie Hancock, Bob Mintzer, Wayne Shorter, Michel Camilo and Bands such as Diakara, Habana Ensemble, DR Big band, WDR Big band, BBC Big band The Savage Rose, The Antonelli Orchestra, Mikkel Nordsø Band and others. In 2008, the newspaper Havana Times labelled him "one of Cuba's top percussionists".

Career 
Eliel Lazo began playing at an early age, egged on by his family. He studied at Oscar Valdes’ school of percussion (former singer and percussionist, of Irakere band). In 2003, at the age of 19, Eliel won the PERCUBA International Percussion Prize. Lazo first visited Denmark in 2004 on an invitation from the Danish Radio Big Band. Other invitations followed. Soon Denmark became a base on his travels around the world, and in 2007 he made Copenhagen his home. He has played with musicians such as Michel Camilo, Chucho Valdes, Changuito, Tata Guines, Herbie Hancock, Bob Mintzer, Oscar Valdes, Carlos del Puerto, Airto Moreira. He has also played with Cuban bands Diakara, Klimax and Habana Ensemble. He has worked with the Danish Radio Big Band, The Savage Rose, The Antonellie Orchestra, Blanco Y Negro, Mikkel Nordsoe Band, Aarhus Jazz Orchestra, Tip Toe Big Band, WDR Bigband from Germany, and BBC Bigband from The UK. In 2004 Lazo recorded his first album Art Ensemble of Habana with Commodo Depots records from Japan. He then released his first recording with Stunt records, Blanco Y Negro, which was done in Cuba. His third album El Conguero, also with Stunt records, was awarded the Danish Music award best album of the year in the world music category. Lazo played on Mikkel Nordsoe 7 Steps to Heaven and Diving in space for 3 decades - Hanne Boel The Shining of sings - the Danish Radio Big Band Cuban Flavor and Spirituasl, where he is featured as percussionist and vocalist. His playing is also featured on the Cubadisco CD Andante of Cesar Lopez Y Habana Ensemble and Kylie Minogue Kiss me once. He performed in the American movie about Cuban music Music Under the Radar. He has taught at conservatories in Cuba, Denmark, Finland, Norway, Switzerland, Germany and Sweden. Eliel's last CD is called Eliel lazo and the Cuban funk Machine featuring American tenor saxophonist Bob Mintzer and a lineup of Cuban, Danish and Swedish musicians. This CD is a tribute to the 70s funk and Cuban Songo. The inspiration is coming from bands such as Irakere, the Head hunters, The Meters and specially Los Van Van. The CD was nominated to the 2015 Cuban Grammys Cubadisco and was nominated for two Danish Grammys (Danish Music Awards) World and Jazz. The CD was dedicated to master Jose Luis Quintana Changuito and Juan Formell (August 2, 1942 - May 1, 2014)

Discography

 2004 Art Ensemble of Havana (Commodo Depots Japan)
 2005 Blanco y Negro (Stunt Records)
 2010 Eliel lzo - El Conguero (Stunt Records)
 2014 Eliel lazo's Copenhagen Social Club (Sony BMG)
 2014 Eliel Lazo & The Cuban Funk Machine (Stunt Records)

Educator 
 2004 Danish Jazz Federation, Vallekilde Højskole summer jazz session (DK)
 2005 Danish Jazz Federation, Vallekilde Højskole summer jazz session (DK
 2004 - 2015 Rhythmic Music Conservatory Copenhagen, Aarhus, Aalborg and Odense Conservatorium (DK)
Turku (FI), Amadeo Roldan and Cuban National Art Schools - ENA (CU)

Zurich University of arts (ZHDK) and Luzern University jazz department (SWI), Stockholm Royal College of Music

Recordings 
 2004 Danish Radio Bigband ''Cuban Flavour'' (Cope Records)
 2005 Havana Ensemble ''Andante'' (Bismusic Records)
 2007 Mikkel Nordsoe 7 Steps to Heaven (Stunt records)
 2008 Marvin Diz ''Habla el tambor'' (Oshosi Swing Records)
 2011 Hanne Boel ''The Shining of things'' (Stunt Records)
 2014 Danish Radio Bigband ''Spirituals'' (Storyville Records)
 2014 Kylie Minogue ''Kiss Me Once'' (Warner Bros)
 2014Yasser Pino & The Latin Syndicate ''Natura''
 2015 Mikkel Nordsoe Diving in space for 3 decades (Stunt records)
 2015 Michael Bladt ''Next Step'' (Gateway Music)
 2016 Gerard Presencer and DR Bigband ''Groove Travels'' (Edition Records)
 2019 Michel Camilo Bigband ''ESSENCE''(Sony Music)

Endorsements
 Gon Bops Percussion
 Innovative Percussion
 Sabian Cymbals 
 Remo Heads
Yamaha Drums and Hardware

Personal life
Eliel Lazo Loves practicing sports, specially Baseball, Basketball and Boxing. He also loves watching Mixed Martial Arts (MMA)

As a kid Eliel was a Greek Roman wrestler from his town team in Marianao, Havana.

He also has a Technical career degree in Economies.

References

External links
http://www.eliellazo.com
http://www.facebook.com/Eliel-Lazo-The-Cuban-Funk-machine-436519533146398/
http://www.gonbops.com/artists/eliel-lazo/
http://www.sabian.com/en/artist/eliel-lazo
http://www.innovativepercussion.com/artists/eliel_lazo

1983 births
Living people
People from Havana
Cuban percussionists